"Forever More" is an electronica-influenced song performed by the band Moloko for their 2003 album Statues. Following its release of 23 June 2003, it reached number 17 on the UK Singles Chart, topped the UK Dance Chart, and peaked at number 15 in Romania.

Musical structure
"Forever More" is a house and dance-style track makes extensive use of two instruments: bass drums and brass horns. These two sounds are aggressively used in a one-and-a-half minute long "ad lib" session; this part of the song was cut out of the radio edit due to time constraints.

Critical reception
"Forever More" was well received by critics. Contact Music called the song an "uplifting [...] dance-floor filler."

Music video

The video features Murphy dancing in a tunnel while singing the song. Over the course of the song she is joined by backup dancers. The video was filmed with Murphy dancing in front of a blue screen, improvising her movements. The backup dancers were added later, filmed dancing in the tunnel. Due to this, the backup dancers sometimes dance out of time with Murphy, the effect that the director wanted.

Track listings

UK CD single
 "Forever More" — 3:47
 "Forever More" (FKEK dub mix) — 7:52
 "Take My Hand" — 6:59
 "Forever More" (video)

UK 12-inch single
A. "Forever More" (FKEK vocal mix) — 10:34
B. "The Time Is Now" (FK's Blissed Out Dub) — 10:27

European CD single
 "Forever More" — 3:47
 "Forever More" (FKEK vocal mix) — 10:34

Charts

Weekly charts

Year-end charts

References

2003 singles
2003 songs
The Echo Label singles
Moloko songs
Roadrunner Records singles
Songs written by Róisín Murphy
Songs written by Mark Brydon